Palicourea padifolia is a species from the genus Palicourea.

References

Rubioideae